Lisa Anne Náñez Stromberg (born 10 March 1977) is an American-born Mexican former women's international footballer who played as a forward. She was a member of the Mexico women's national football team.

Born in the United States, Nanez qualified to represent Mexico internationally through her paternal grandfather. She was part of the team at the 1999 FIFA Women's World Cup. She was also about to be part of the Mexican squad that competed in the 2004 Summer Olympics, but an administrative error left her out of that team.

References

1977 births
Living people
Citizens of Mexico through descent
Mexican women's footballers
Mexico women's international footballers
People from Los Gatos, California
1999 FIFA Women's World Cup players
Women's association football forwards
American sportspeople of Mexican descent
American women's soccer players
Santa Clara Broncos women's soccer players
San Jose CyberRays players
California Storm players
Women's Premier Soccer League players
Women's United Soccer Association players